Vmw65, also known as VP16 or α-TIF (Trans Inducing Factor) is a trans-acting protein that forms a complex with the host transcription factors Oct-1 and HCF to induce immediate early gene transcription in the herpes simplex viruses.

VP16 is a strong transactivator and is often used in Y2H systems as the activation domain of the system.

References

Simplexviruses
Viral nonstructural proteins